Murat Tleshev (born 18 April 1980) is a Kazakh former professional footballer who played as a forward. He scored more than 100 goals in 350 matches in the Kazakhstan Premier League. He made eight appearances scoring one goal for the Kazakh national team.

Career statistics

Club

International 

Scores and results list Kazakhstan's goal tally first, score column indicates score after each Tleshev goal.

Honours 
Zhenis Astana/Astana
 Kazakhstan Premier League: 2000, 2001, 2006
 Kazakhstan Cup: 2000–01

Irtysh Pavlodar
 Kazakhstan Premier League: 2003

Aktobe
 Kazakhstan Premier League: 2009

Individual
 Kazakhstan League Topscorer top-goalscorer: 2005, 2008, 2009

References

External links 

1981 births
Living people
Association football forwards
Kazakhstani footballers
Kazakhstan international footballers
Kazakhstan Premier League players
FC Irtysh Pavlodar players
FC Aktobe players
FC Shakhter Karagandy players
FC Taraz players
FC Ordabasy players
FC Zhetysu players
FC Zhenis Astana players
FC Atyrau players
People from Taraz